Mönchteich is a lake in the Mecklenburgische Seenplatte district in Mecklenburg-Vorpommern, Germany. At an elevation of 62.4 m, its surface area is 0.042 km².

Lakes of Mecklenburg-Western Pomerania
Ponds of Mecklenburg-Western Pomerania